Alvan Ernest Whittle (20 September 1919 – 28 September 2008) was an Australian rules footballer who played for the Hawthorn Football Club in the Victorian Football League (VFL).

Notes

External links 

1919 births
2008 deaths
Australian rules footballers from Western Australia
Hawthorn Football Club players
East Perth Football Club players
West Perth Football Club players